Jean Charton de Millou (1736–1792) was a French Jesuit.

References

1736 births
1792 deaths
French beatified people
18th-century French Jesuits
French clergy killed in the French Revolution